Triamcinolone benetonide (brand names Alcorten, Benecorten, Tibicorten; also known as triamcinolone acetonide 21-(benzoyl-β-aminoisobutyrate) or TBI) is a synthetic glucocorticoid corticosteroid.

References

Acetonides
Secondary alcohols
Benzamides
Corticosteroid esters
Organofluorides
Glucocorticoids
Carboxylate esters
Phenyl compounds
Pregnanes